Louisiana Highway 92 (LA 92) is a state highway located in southern Louisiana.  It runs  in an east–west direction from U.S. Highway 90 (US 90) east of Mermentau to LA 339 in Youngsville.

The route passes through several small villages and unincorporated communities, such as Morse, Indian Bayou, Maurice, and Milton.  It traverses the rural area between the parallel US 90 and LA 14 corridors.  Many of the highways intersecting LA 92, such as US 167 and LA 35, connect the two corridors and provide access to Interstate 10 (I-10) to the north.  The eastern terminus of LA 92 is located just within the corporate limits of Youngsville, a suburban city south of Lafayette.

LA 92 was created in the 1955 Louisiana Highway renumbering from portions of several former state routes.  Through most of its existence, the route continued through Youngsville and across US 90 to a junction with LA 31 just south of St. Martinville.  This eastern segment became LA 92-1 in 2013 when much of the route within Youngsville was transferred to the city following a highway improvement project, which created a gap in state maintenance.  In the future, more of LA 92, extending west from Youngsville to Maurice, is to be eliminated from the state highway system as part of the Louisiana Department of Transportation and Development's (La DOTD) Road Transfer Program.

Route description
It heads south along the winding Mermentau Cove Road for  before turning due east. After making a zigzag onto a parallel section line road, LA 92 follows Whitney Street through the village of Morse, where it intersects LA 91 (Jackson Avenue). LA 92 continues east through rural Acadia Parish for another , intersecting LA 1124 south of Estherwood and LA 13 south of Crowley. The highway then crosses Bayou Queue De Tortue into Vermilion Parish.

LA 92 passes through the northern portion of Vermilion Parish, where it makes several more right-angle turns.  This stretch includes brief concurrencies with three other highways.  The first is LA 35, connecting with Rayne to the north and Kaplan to the south.  The second is with LA 700 and is located in an area known as Indian Bayou.  Further east, LA 92 intersects LA 343 and follows West Lafayette Street into the village of Maurice.  Here, the route makes another zigzag via US 167, connecting with Lafayette to the north and Abbeville to the south.

Heading east from Maurice, LA 92 crosses a vertical lift bridge over Bayou Vermilion and into the small Lafayette Parish community of Milton.  The highway proceeds  further to a roundabout junction with LA 339 (Verot School Road) at the western edge of Youngsville, a small suburban city.  East Milton Avenue continues straight ahead into town as a local road.

Route classification and data
LA 92 is an undivided two-lane highway for its entire length, except the brief concurrency with US 167 in Maurice, where it is four lanes with a center turning lane. It is generally classified by the Louisiana Department of Transportation and Development (La DOTD) as a rural minor or major collector west of Maurice and as an urban minor arterial between Maurice and Youngsville. Daily traffic volume in 2013 ranged from 400 vehicles near Mermentau to 8,800 vehicles near Youngsville.

History
In the original Louisiana Highway system in use between 1921 and 1955, the modern LA 92 was part of several routes, including State Route 1018 from Mermentau to Morse, State Route 294 from Indian Bayou to Maurice, and State Route 175 from Maurice to Youngsville.  The remainder of the route between Morse and Indian Bayou consisted of local roads during this time.

LA 92 was designated in the 1955 renumbering, creating a continuous route through the communities midway between US 90 and LA 14.  It also extended through the center of Youngsville and included the route of LA 92-1 as far as Cinco.

For a time, LA 92 followed a more serpentine path through Acadia Parish east of Morse and passed through Lyons Point, located at a junction with LA 13. The route was straightened by utilizing parallel section line roads taken into the state highway system after the 1955 renumbering. The eastern terminus was extended slightly from LA 31 at Cinco when a swing bridge was constructed across Bayou Teche in 1984. Several right-angle turns were also eliminated by extending Iberia Street eastward from the junction to connect directly with Young Street. The project, completed in 2013, created a discontinuity in state maintenance of LA 92, and the portion of the highway east of Youngsville was re-designated as LA 92-1.

Future
Under this plan of "right-sizing" the state highway system, the portion of LA 92 between Maurice and Youngsville is proposed for deletion as it no longer meets a significant interurban travel function.

Major intersections

Auxiliary route

Louisiana Highway 92-1 (LA 92-1) runs  in an east–west direction from the junction of two local roads in Youngsville to LA 347 south of St. Martinville.  It was part of LA 92 until a portion of the route in Youngsville was transferred to local control in 2013, creating a gap in state maintenance.

From the west, LA 92-1 begins at the junction of Young Street and Larrivere Road near the eastern edge of Youngsville in Lafayette Parish.  The route heads due east to a junction with US 90 and turns south onto that highway, crossing into St. Martin Parish.  After a short distance, LA 92-1 turns east again and follows Smede Highway as it zigzags to a junction with LA 182 (Old Spanish Trail Highway) at Cade.   later, LA 92-1 crosses LA 31 just south of St. Martinville at a point known as Cinco.  The route proceeds a short distance further across a swing bridge spanning Bayou Teche to a terminus at LA 347 (Cemetery Road) on the opposite bank.

LA 92-1 is an undivided two-lane highway for its entire length, with the exception of the US 90 concurrency, which is an undivided four-lane highway. It is generally classified as a rural major collector by the Louisiana Department of Transportation and Development (La DOTD). The average daily traffic volume in 2013 ranged between 2,500 and 3,600 vehicles over the entire route.

Prior to the 1955 Louisiana Highway renumbering, LA 92-1 was part of State Route 175 between Youngsville and Cade.  The portion between Cade and Cinco was designated as State Route C-1491.  The entire route was part of LA 92 from 1955 until 2013, when the portion of LA 92 through Youngsville was transferred to the city and eliminated from the state highway system, creating a gap in state maintenance.  The transfer was part of a highway improvement project that straightened the route of LA 92 through town and converted the junction with LA 89 to a roundabout.  Upon its completion, the eastern portion of LA 92 became LA 92-1.  In the future, LA 92-1 is planned to be truncated on its west end to the junction with US 90 near the Lafayette–St. Martin parish line as part of La DOTD's Road Transfer Program.

Major intersections

See also

Major Cities and Towns in Highway 92 and 339 Roundabout

Erath

Youngsville

Milton

Lafayette

Major Cities and Towns in Highway 167, 92 and 182 Intersection

Abbeville

Opelousas

Milton

Lafayette

References

External links

Maps / GIS Data Homepage, Louisiana Department of Transportation and Development

0092
Transportation in Acadia Parish, Louisiana
Transportation in Vermilion Parish, Louisiana
Transportation in Lafayette Parish, Louisiana
Transportation in St. Martin Parish, Louisiana